Erythroxylum zeylanicum is a species of plant in the Erythroxylaceae family. It is endemic to Sri Lanka.

Uses
leaves- medicinal.

References

External links
 
 https://archive.today/20140616042436/http://www.dlib.pdn.ac.lk/archive/handle/123456789/3565
 https://www.researchgate.net/publication/12612777_Tropane_alkaloids_from_Erythroxylum_zeylanicum_O.E._Schulz_(Erythroxylaceae)

zeylanicum
Endemic flora of Sri Lanka